Heksefjellet ("The Witch Mountain") is a mountain in Oscar II Land at Spitsbergen, Svalbard. It reaches a height of 774 m.a.s.l. and is located between the glaciers of Heksebreen and Stallobreen, south of Eidembreen. The mountain is part of the mountainous district of Trollheimen.

References

Mountains of Spitsbergen